The grey thornbill, ashy gerygone or mountain gerygone (Acanthiza cinerea) is a species of bird in the family Acanthizidae. It is found in the highlands of New Guinea. Its habitat includes subtropical and tropical moist montane forests.

References

grey thornbill
Birds of New Guinea
grey thornbill
Taxonomy articles created by Polbot